"Be My Girl" is a song performed by American R&B singer Eamon issued as the first single from his forthcoming studio album Golden Rail Motel. It was his first single since 2007's "(How Could You) Bring Him Home". The song was written by Eamon along with producers Stoupe and Snipe Young.

Music video
"Be My Girl" was shot in early 2017 in Philadelphia, Pennsylvania. The video debuted on April 7, 2017. It features footage from the early 1970s showing the family of one of the song's producers, Stoupe. The video is dedicated to Stoupe's mother, who had recently died from cancer.

Personnel

Eamon – lead vocals, background vocals
Jake Najor – drums
Dave Wilder – bass guitar
Dan Hastie – piano
Dan Ubick – guitar and Hammond B-3 organ
Connie Price – tambourine
James King – tenor and baritone saxophone
Jordan Katz – trumpet, valve trombone, flugelhorn

Horn arrangements by Snipe Young
All music recorded at The Lion's Den in Topanga Canyon, California
All vocals recorded at The Space Ship in Los Angeles, California
Mixed by Steve Kaye at SunKing Studios
Mastered by Dave Cooley at Elysian Masters

External links
Lyrics

2017 songs
2017 singles
Eamon (singer) songs